Miss Earth United States 2017 was the 13th edition of  Miss Earth United States pageant that was held at Rachel M. Schlesinger Concert Hall in Alexandria, Virginia. Corrin Stellakis of New York crowned her successor Andreia Gibau of Massachusetts as Miss Earth United States 2017. Gibau represented the United States in the Miss Earth 2017 pageant in the Philippines.

The pageant held its pre-pageant activities and preliminary events in the Washington metropolitan area prior to the crowning event. 

A 40-minute commercial-free edited broadcast of the event was televised on October 8, 2017 on the Dish Network.

Results

Awards

High Point Awards

Non-Finalist Awards

Other Awards

Order of announcement

Top 20
 Louisiana
 California
 Texas
 New England
 Tennessee
 Northwest
 Florida
 Midwest
 Pennsylvania
 Michigan
 Nebraska
 Massachsuetts
 Oklahoma
 Vermont
 Maryland
 Southeast
 District of Columbia
 Virgin Islands
 Missouri
 Mississippi

Top 15
 Mississippi
 Maryland
 Louisiana
 Michigan
 Vermont
 Northwest
 Florida
 Nebraska
 California
 Tennessee
 Massachusetts
 Oklahoma
 Midwest
 Texas
 District of Columbia

Top 10
 Texas
 Massachusetts
 Nebraska
 Mississippi
 Oklahoma
 District of Columbia
 Northwest
 Louisiana
 Vermont
 Maryland

Top 4
 Northwest
 Texas
 District of Columbia
 Massachusetts

Pageant 
Pageant activities and preliminary rounds took place from August 2-6, 2017 in the Washington metropolitan area, which included a service day in Washington, D.C. with delegates from the Teen, Miss, and Elite divisions.

Additionally, delegates were scored on their social media activity leading up to the national pageant, as well as their environmental project that occurred in June for the organization's Think Local, Act Global initiative.

All phases of the pageant were available via livestream on the Miss Earth United States Facebook page.

During the final competition, the top 20 competed in runway, while the top 15 also competed in swimsuit, and the top ten in evening gown. The top four competed in an on-stage question round where they were scored on their response to what their legacy would be during their reign as Miss Earth United States.

Delegates
Listed below are 47 contestants from various states, geographical regions, and territories that have competed for the title:

Unrepresented states

Judges
Finals judges

 Luissa Burton - Miss Earth England 2016
 CJ Comu, CEO & Founder Chairman of EarthWater
 Lisa Forbes - Miss Earth United States 2007
 Ayesha Gilani-Taylor – Miss Earth Pakistan 2009
 Andrea Neu - Miss Earth Air 2014
 Amanda Bluestein - Miss Earth United States 2006, and Miss South Carolina USA 2004, 1st Runner-Up at Miss USA 2004
 Stephen P. Smith - Founder & CEO of Planet Beach and HOTWORX
 Derek Tokarzewski - Owner of World Class Beauty Queens Magazine

References

External links
 

Miss Earth United States
Beauty pageants in the United States
August 2017 events in the United States
2017 beauty pageants
2017 in Washington, D.C.